Arctoparmelia is a genus of ring lichens in the family Parmeliaceae. The genus was circumscribed by American lichenologist Mason Hale in 1986 with A. centrifuga (formerly in Xanthoparmelia) as the type species. Hale included five species in his original conception of the genus; the Siberian species A. collatolica was added in 2019.

Species
Arctoparmelia aleuritica  (Nyl.) Hale (1986)
Arctoparmelia centrifuga (concentric ring lichen) (L.) Hale (1986)
Arctoparmelia collatolica Chesnokov & Prokopiev (2019)
Arctoparmelia incurva (finger ring lichen) (Pers.) Hale (1986)
Arctoparmelia separata (rippled ring lichen) (Th. Fr.) Hale (1986)
Arctoparmelia subcentrifuga (abrading ring lichen) (Oxner) Hale (1986)

References

Parmeliaceae
Lichen genera
Lecanorales genera
Taxa named by Mason Hale
Taxa described in 1986